West Virginia's 10th Senate district is one of 17 districts in the West Virginia Senate. It is currently represented by and Republicans Jack Woodrum and Vince Deeds. All districts in the West Virginia Senate elect two members to staggered four-year terms.

Geography
District 10 covers all of Fayette, Greenbrier, Monroe, and Summers Counties in Southern West Virginia. Communities within the district include Alderson, Hinton, Lewisburg, Ronceverte, White Sulphur Springs, Rainelle, Fairlea, Montgomery, Mount Hope, Oak Hill, Ansted, and Fayetteville.

The district is located entirely within West Virginia's 3rd congressional district, and overlaps with the 28th, 32nd, 41st, and 42nd districts of the West Virginia House of Delegates. It borders the state of Virginia.

Recent election results

2022

Historical election results

2020

2018
Democrat Stephen Baldwin was appointed in 2017 to serve the remaining term of Ronald F. Miller, who had resigned to take a position in the administration of Governor Jim Justice.

2016

2014

2012

Federal and statewide results in District 10

References

10
Fayette County, West Virginia
Greenbrier County, West Virginia
Monroe County, West Virginia
Summers County, West Virginia